William Newton (1730–1798) was an English architect who worked mainly in Newcastle upon Tyne and Northumberland. His work shows a conventional but elegant classical style, influenced by Adam and Paine, and with a strong Palladian feel typical of late 18th century architecture. Most of his buildings are stately homes in rural Northumberland, but he also created some interesting public works in Newcastle: The Assembly Rooms,  St Anne's Church,  the refaced Guildhall, and elegant private housing in Charlotte Square.

He was the son of Robert Newton, a builder. He married Dorothy Bell and lived for 28 years at 1, Charlotte Square, Newcastle. His big break came when he was appointed architect for The Assembly Rooms in Newcastle in 1774; as a result he became favoured by the Northumbrian elite. He has been described as 'the first truly Nothumbrian architect'.

His work includes:-

 The Infirmary, Newcastle 1751-2 (demolished 1954)
 Capheaton Hall (North front) 1758
 St Mungo, Simonburn (rebuilding of aisles) 1763
 St Ann's Church, Newcastle 1764
 Charlotte Square, Newcastle 1770
 Kielder Castle 1772
 Assembly Rooms, Newcastle 1774-6
 Killingworth House (probably added wings) 1770s (demolished 1954)
 The Castle, Castle Eden c1775
 Shawdon Hall 1779 (probable attribution)
 Backworth Hall 1780
 Acton House 1781
 Charlton Hall 1782
 Howick Hall 1782
 Heaton Hall (refronting) 1783 (demolished 1933)
 The Temple, Heaton Hall (now at Blagdon Hall) 1783
 St Nicholas Cathedral, Newcastle 1783-7, (internal restoration), with David Stephenson
 Whitfield Hall 1785
 Hebburn Hall 1790
 St Bartholomew's Church, Longbenton 1790
 Dissington Hall 1794
 Guildhall, Newcastle upon Tyne 1794, (refronting), with David Stephenson
 Hesleyside Hall (East front) 1796
 Lemmington Hall (alterations)
 Fenham Hall (attribution and date uncertain)

McCombie and Grundy have used stylistic evidence to suggest some additional attributions: 
 The Lodge, Capheaton village
 Craster Tower (South wing) 1769
 Close House 1779
 Newton Hall
 Togston Hall

Faulkner and Lowery make one additional suggestion:

 Broome Park, Edlingham (demolished 1953)

References

 Oxford Dictionary of National Biography. Article by Margaret Willis 2004
 The Buildings of England: Northumberland. (1992) Grundy, J., McCombie, G., Ryder, P., Welfare, H. & Pevsner, N.
 Patronage and Palladianism: the career of William Newton (1730-98), architect. Thesis by Richard Pears, Newcastle University

1730 births
1798 deaths
18th-century English architects
People from Newcastle upon Tyne
Architects from Northumberland